Marcos Daniel Martinich (born 8 August 1996) is an Argentine professional footballer who plays as a left-back.

Career
Martinich started his career in the ranks of Primera División side Rosario Central. In August 2016, Martinich was loaned to Talleres. However, he didn't feature for the Primera División club in senior football and returned to Rosario Central months after joining. On 5 September 2017, Villa Dálmine completed the loan signing of Martinich. He made his professional debut on 16 September during a 2–0 victory over Boca Unidos. Martinich remained there for two seasons, appearing in a total of twenty-seven matches; he also scored his first senior goal, netting in a Copa Argentina defeat away to River Plate on 29 July 2018.

July 2019 saw Martinich sign for fellow Primera B Nacional team Temperley in a permanent deal. He appeared just once for the club, in a home loss to Ferro Carril Oeste in December, in a season that was ended early due to the COVID-19 pandemic. In September 2020, Martinich moved abroad to join Peruvian Segunda División side Santos. He scored his first goal for them in a 4–3 defeat to Unión Comercio on 18 November, having made his debut a few weeks prior against Cultural Santa Rosa.

Career statistics
.

References

External links

1996 births
Living people
Sportspeople from Santa Fe Province
Argentine footballers
Association football midfielders
Argentine expatriate footballers
Primera Nacional players
Peruvian Segunda División players
Rosario Central footballers
Talleres de Córdoba footballers
Villa Dálmine footballers
Club Atlético Temperley footballers
Santos de Nasca players
Expatriate footballers in Peru
Argentine expatriate sportspeople in Peru